William Francis McCabe (31 January 1908 – 10 April 1945) was an Australian rules footballer who played with North Melbourne in the Victorian Football League (VFL).

Notes

External links 

1908 births
1945 deaths
Australian rules footballers from Melbourne
North Melbourne Football Club players
Australian Army personnel of World War II
Australian Army soldiers
People from North Melbourne
Military personnel from Melbourne